The Indian Meteorological Society is an Indian non-profit organisation that promotes the advancement, dissemination, and application of meteorology and related sciences.

The society was established in 1956.

External links
Indian Meteorological Society website
Indian Meteorological Society, Kolkata Chapter website
Indian Meteorological Society, Pune Chapter website
IMS Objectives

Meteorological societies
Scientific societies based in India
Scientific organizations established in 1956